A soufflé is a baked egg-based dish originating in France in the early eighteenth century. Combined with various other ingredients, it can be served as a savory main dish or sweetened as a dessert. The word soufflé is the past participle of the French verb souffler which means "to blow," "to breathe," "to inflate," or "to puff."

History

The earliest mention of the soufflé is attributed to French master cook 
Vincent La Chapelle, in the early eighteenth century. The development and popularization of the soufflé is usually traced to French chef Marie-Antoine Carême in the early nineteenth century.

Ingredients and preparation
Soufflés are typically prepared from two basic components:
 a flavored crème pâtissière, cream sauce or béchamel, or a purée as the base
 egg whites beaten to a soft peak

The base provides the flavor, and the egg whites provide the "lift" or puffiness to the dish. Foods commonly used to flavor the base include herbs, cheese and vegetables for savory soufflés and jam, fruits, berries, chocolate, banana and lemon for dessert soufflés.

Soufflés are generally baked in ramekins or soufflé dishes: these are typically glazed, flat-bottomed, round porcelain containers with unglazed bottoms, vertical or nearly vertical sides and fluted exterior borders. The ramekin, or another baking vessel, may be coated with a thin film of butter to prevent the soufflé from sticking. Some preparations also include adding a coating of sugar, bread crumbs, or a grated hard cheese such as parmesan inside the ramekin in addition to the butter; some cooks believe this allows the soufflé to rise more easily.

After being cooked, a soufflé is puffed up and fluffy, and it will generally fall after 5 or 10 minutes (as risen dough does). It may be served with a sauce atop the soufflé, such as a sweet dessert sauce, or with a sorbet or ice-cream on the side. When served, the top of a soufflé may be punctured with serving utensils to separate it into individual servings. This can also enable a sauce to integrate into the dish.

Variations
There are a number of both savory and sweet soufflé flavor variations. Savory soufflés often include cheese, and vegetables such as spinach, carrot and herbs, and may sometimes incorporate poultry, bacon, ham, or seafood for a more substantial dish. Sweet soufflés may be based on a chocolate or fruit sauce (lemon or raspberry, for example) and are often served with a dusting of powdered sugar. Frugal recipes sometimes emphasize the possibilities for making soufflés from leftovers.

A soufflé may be served alone, with ice cream, fruit, or a sauce.

Apple soufflé is made by lining a cake tin with pureed rice boiled in sweetened milk and baking it until it sets. The rice "border" is filled with thickened apple marmalade and whipped egg whites and baked until it rises.

See also

 Chawanmushi
 Fruit whip
 Salzburger Nockerl
 List of cakes
 List of custard desserts
 List of French dishes
 List of egg dishes

References

Further reading
 241 pages.

External links

Custard desserts
Egg dishes
French desserts
Hungarian desserts